George Alex Katunich (born August 18, 1976) is an American musician. He is best known as the former bassist of Incubus.

Since high school, Katunich has used the stage name of Dirk Lance, which was apparently taken from the credits of a pornographic film from the 1970s. A founding member of Incubus, he departed the band in 2003.

Career

Incubus
Katunich was a member of Incubus from 1991 to 2003, playing bass guitar on the albums Fungus Amongus, Enjoy Incubus, S.C.I.E.N.C.E., Make Yourself, and Morning View.

After Incubus
Katunich later entered the video game industry with Stickman Entertainment. He has worked on titles like WWE Smackdown. In 2012, Katunich joined forces with his first bass teacher Stray Deuce and Germany native Alexa Brinkschulte to form Willie's Nerve Clinic. In September 2013, Katunich and former bandmate Jose Pasillas II, along with former Pharcyde MC Slimkid3 and Jurassic 5's DJ Nu-Mark, under the name 4 Player Co-Op, released the song "Picture Perfect Phantasy," inspired by the video game Rayman Legends. 

Katunich spent the 2010s with Willie's Nerve Clinic before joining with Kyle Mortensen to form his current band and latest collaboration East of June in 2019.

References

External links
Dirk Lance's 2000 Incubus Bass Rig. GuitarGeek.com

1976 births
American rock bass guitarists
American male bass guitarists
Incubus (band) members
Living people
People from Bell Canyon, California
American male guitarists
Guitarists from California
21st-century American bass guitarists
Place of birth missing (living people)